Tiny Little Houses are a lo-fi, Indie rock band from Melbourne, Australia.

Biography
Tiny Little Houses was formed in Melbourne in 2014 and have grown from a SoundCloud collaboration between front man Caleb Karvountzis and guitarist Sean Mullins into an established band with the addition of bassist Al Yamin and drummer Clancy Bond.

The band released the EPs You Tore Out My Heart in 2015 and Snow Globe in 2016. 

Tiny Little Houses' debut album Idiot Proverbs was released on 21 January 2018.

Their second album Misericorde was released on 19 November 2021.

Members
 Caleb Karvountzis – Vocals, Guitar
 Sean Mullins – Lead Guitar, Backing Vocals
 Al Yamin – Bass, Backing Vocals
 Clancy Bond – Drums

Discography

Studio albums

Extended plays

Singles

Music videos

References 

Australian indie rock groups